385th may refer to:

385th Air Expeditionary Group, constituted as the 385th Bombardment Group (Heavy) on 25 November 1942 Activated on 1 December 1942
385th Fighter Squadron, inactive United States Air Force unit
385th Infantry Division (Wehrmacht), also known as a "Rheingold" Division, created on 10 January 1942 in Fallingbostel
385th Infantry Regiment (United States), part of the 76th Infantry Division of the US Army during World War II; fought in Germany

See also
385 (number)
385, the year 385 (CCCLXXXV) of the Julian calendar
385 BC